The Bhandarkar Oriental Research Institute (BORI) is located in Pune, Maharashtra, India. It was founded on 6 July 1917 and named after Ramakrishna Gopal Bhandarkar (1837–1925), long regarded as the founder of Indology (Orientalism) in India. The institute is well known for its collection of old Sanskrit and Prakrit manuscripts.

The institute
This institute is of a public trust registered under Act XXI of 1860. Initially, the institute received an annual grant of 3,000 rupees from the government of Bombay. Presently, it is partially supported by annual grants from the government of Maharashtra. The institute also receives grants from the government of India and the University Grants Commission for specific research projects.

The institute has one of the largest collections of rare books and manuscripts in South Asia, consisting of over 125,000 books and 29,510 manuscripts. The institute publishes a journal, Annals of the Bhandarkar Oriental Research Institute, four times a year. The institute also hosts the Manuscripts Resource and Conservation Centre under the auspices of the National Mission for Manuscripts, a project of the Ministry of Culture of the government of India. In 2007, the Rigveda manuscripts preserved at the Institute were included in UNESCO’s Memory of the World Register.

The manuscript collection
The government of Bombay, in 1866, started a pan Indian Manuscript Collection project. Noted scholars like Georg Bühler, F. Kielhorn, Peter Peterson, Ramkrishna Gopal Bhandarkar, S. R. Bhandarkar, Kathavate and Ghate collected more than 17,000 important manuscripts under this project. This collection was first deposited at Elphinstone College in Bombay. Then it was transferred to Deccan College (Pune) for better preservation. After the Bhandarkar Oriental Research Institute (BORI) was founded in 1917, the BORI founders proposed to offer even better preservation and research. Hence Lord Willingdon, the then governor of the Bombay Presidency and the first president of BORI,  transferred the valuable government collection of manuscripts to the BORI on 1 April 1918. The first curator, P.K. Gode took active initiatives to enhance this collection. Presently, the Institute has over 29,000 manuscripts.

The largest part of the collection (17,877 Manuscripts) is part of the "Government Manuscript Library", while there is an additional collection of 11,633 manuscripts. The most prized collections include a paper manuscript of the  dated 1320 and a palmleaf manuscript of the  dated 906.

Among the several scholars referring to the works at BORI, the most well-known person arguably is the Bharat Ratna awardee, Pt. Pandurang Vaman Kane.

The critical edition of the Mahabharata
A long-term project under the auspices of BORI, started on 1 April 1919, was the preparation of a critical edition of the Mahabharata. V.S. Sukthankar was appointed general editor of the project on 1 August 1925 and he continued until his death on 21 January 1943. After his death, S.K. Belvalkar was appointed general editor on 1 April 1943. On 1 April 1961, P. L. Vaidya was appointed as general editor of the project on the retirement of S. K. Belvalkar. R. N. Dandekar was appointed as the joint general editor on 6 July 1957. To widespread acclaim, the completion for publication was announced on 22 September 1966, by Sarvapalli Radhakrishnan, then president of India, at a special function held at the institute.

The Shloka composition in the BORI critical edition of the Mahabharata

 Arjuna – 35% in the form of Anusthipchand (various names used as a glorification of the protagonist of the epic)
 Krishna – 19%
 Yudhisthira – 14%
 Bhishma – 10%
 Duryodhana – 8%
 Bhima – 6%

Other characters represent around 10% of shlokas

The critical edition was collated from 1,259 manuscripts. This edition in 19 volumes (more than 15,000 demi-quarto size pages) comprised the critically constituted text of the 18 parvas of the Mahabharata consisting of more than 89,000 verses, an elaborate critical apparatus and a prolegomena on the material and methodology (volume I), written by V.S. Sukthankar.

Further work since the initial publication has produced a critical edition of the Harivamsa, a pratika index, a bibliography of ancillary materials, and a cultural index. The project of preparing a critical edition of the Harivamsa was inaugurated by the president of India, Rajendra Prasad, on 19 November 1954. The publication was completed in November 1971. The critical edition in two volumes consists of the four parvans of the Harivamsa. The pratika Index in six volumes consists of 360,000 verse quarters with appendices. Two volumes of the cultural index have been published so far. The constituted text of the critical edition has also been made available on the CD-ROM.

Donation by Nizam and the "Nizam guest house"
In 1932, there was a need for money for the publication of the Mahabharata. A formal request was made to the seventh nizam of Hyderabad, Mir Osman Ali Khan, who granted Rs.1000 /- per year for a period of 11 years and offered Rs 50,000 for construction of the guest house which is called "Nizam Guest House".

The office of the university was operated at Nizam Guest House until June 1, 1949.

Vandalism in 2004
The institute was vandalized on 5 January 2004 by a mob composed of members of an extremist self-styled Maratha youth squad, calling themselves the Sambhaji Brigade, named after the elder son of Chhatrapati Shivaji Maharaj.

The incident provoked widespread reaction and led historian Gajanan Mehendale to destroy parts of his in-progress biography of Shivaji.

The vandalism and the subsequent ban on the book were denounced in a statement by historians, among whom were R.S. Sharma, R.C. Thakran, Suraj Bhan, Irfan Habib, D N Jha, Shireen Moosvi and K. M. Shrimali. Oxford University Press, publisher of James Laine's Shivaji: Hindu King in Islamic India, withdrew the book after protests from historian Ninad Bedekar and other right-wing politicians due to what they claimed to be 'objectionable' statements about Shivaji Maharaj.

See also
Pandurang Vaman Kane
Deccan College Post-Graduate and Research Institute

References

External links

The Official Website of BORI 

Indology
South Asian manuscripts
Archives in India
Research institutes in Pune
Historiography of India
Universities and colleges in Pune
Educational institutions established in 1917
1917 establishments in India